The 1957 BYU Cougars football team was an American football team that represented Brigham Young University (BYU) as a member of the Skyline Conference during the 1957 NCAA University Division football season. In their second season under head coach Hal Kopp, the Cougars compiled an overall record of 5–3–2 with a mark of 5–1–1 against conference opponents, finished second in the Skyline, and were outscored by a total of 138 to 134.

The team's statistical leaders included Carroll Johnston with 447 passing yards, Weldon Jackson with 605 rushing yards and 605 yards of total offense, Steve Campora with 19 points, and R. K. Brown with 183 receiving yards. The Roster Also included Mel Brown.

Schedule

References

BYU
BYU Cougars football seasons
BYU Cougars football